Squamicapilla arenata is a moth in the family Cossidae, and the only species in the genus Squamicapilla. It is found in the Philippines.

References

Natural History Museum Lepidoptera generic names catalog

Metarbelinae
Moths described in 1908